Iraj Danaeifard (11 March 1951 – 12 December 2018) was an Iranian football player who played most of his career for Taj and also the Iran national football team.

Club career
Danaeifard became involved in football at a young age. His father, Ali Danaeifard was one of the founders of Taj SC football club. He became famous in Iran while playing for the club, winning the Iranian league in 1971. He also played for Oghab F.C. and Pas F.C., where he won the Iranian Takht Jamshid in 1977. In 1977, he returned to Taj.

In 1980, he moved to the United States and started playing for the NASL team, the Tulsa Roughnecks. He remained in the club until 1984 when the league folded, and retired from football soon thereafter.

International career
Danaeifard was invited to the national team for the first time in 1977 and helped the team qualify for 1978 World Cup. He played well in the tournament and many still remember his goal against Scotland, which was Iran's first goal ever at a World Cup. After the Asian Cup in Kuwait in 1980 and reaching the third place he retired from international football with 17 caps and 3 goals for his country.

Death
Danaeifard died on 12 December 2018 of liver failure.  He was 67.

Career statistics

International goals

References

External links

  National Team Statistics
 Interview with Irankicks.com
 Tulsa Roughnecks stats

1951 births
2018 deaths
Esteghlal F.C. players
1978 FIFA World Cup players
1980 AFC Asian Cup players
Iranian expatriate footballers
Iranian footballers
North American Soccer League (1968–1984) indoor players
North American Soccer League (1968–1984) players
Tulsa Roughnecks (1978–1984) players
Iran international footballers
Sportspeople from Tehran
Expatriate soccer players in the United States
Iranian expatriate sportspeople in the United States
Association football midfielders
Deaths from liver failure
20th-century Iranian people